Charice: Home for Valentine's  is a TV Special produced by GMA Network for Valentine's Day 2011 with Filipino singer Jake Zyrus. The special was originally supposed to be shot in November as Charice: Home for Christmas, but it was reshot due to illness.

Main singer
Charice Pempengco

Guest singers
Ogie Alcasid
Michael V.
Rachelle Ann Go
Elmo Magalona

See also
 List of GMA Network specials aired

References

External links
Official Website of GMA Network
Official Website of GMA Pinoy TV

GMA Network television specials
2011 Philippine television series debuts